Psychic Thoughts (Are What I Conceive?) is the second studio album by American rapper Ganksta NIP. It was released on July 6, 1993, through Rap-A-Lot Records. Recording sessions took place at Jungle Style Studios and at Digital Services in Houston. Production was handled by Crazy C, John Bido, Landmine Productions, K-Rino, Ganksta NIP, and J. Prince, who also served as executive producer. It features guest appearances form Dope-E, K-Rino, Lez Moné and Point Blank. The album peaked at number 151 on the Billboard 200, number 30 on the Top R&B/Hip-Hop Albums and number 5 on the Top Heatseekers.

Track listing

Personnel
Rowdy "Ganksta NIP" Williams – main performer, producer
Leslie "Lez Moné" Hall – featured performer (track 5)
Eric "K-Rino" Kaiser – featured performer (track 11), producer
Al-Khidr Zodoqyah Israel – featured performer (track 11), producer, mixing
Reginald "Point Blank" Gilliand – featured performer (track 11)
Simon "Crazy C" Cullins – producer, mixing
John Okuribido – producer, mixing
Egypt E – producer, mixing
James A. Smith – producer, executive producer, project coordinator, management
Mike Dean – engineering, mixing, mastering
John Moran – mastering
Troy "Pee Wee" Clark – engineering assistant
Jungle Style Productions – engineering assistant
Tony "Big Chief" Randle – project coordinator, management
Leroy Robinson, Jr. – art direction, design
In A Flash Photography – photography

Charts

References

External links

1993 albums
Horrorcore albums
Ganksta N-I-P albums
Rap-A-Lot Records albums